Jean-François Carenco (born 7 July 1952) is a French politician currently serving as Minister of the Overseas in the Borne government.

References

See also 

 Borne government

Living people
1952 births
HEC Paris alumni
École nationale d'administration alumni
People from Gironde
Government ministers of France
French Ministers of Overseas France
Independent politicians in France
Members of the Borne government